Gaiba is a comune (municipality) in the province of Rovigo in the Italian region Veneto, located about  southwest of Venice and about  southwest of Rovigo.

Twin towns
 Alwernia, Poland
 Collegno, Italy
 Rocchetta Sant'Antonio, Italy

References

Cities and towns in Veneto